Denmark–Thailand relations refers to the diplomatic foreign relations between Denmark and Thailand. Denmark having an embassy in Bangkok, and Thailand an embassy in Copenhagen.

Relations with Siam
A treaty of Friendship between Denmark and Siam, was signed in Bangkok on 21 May 1859.

See also
 Foreign relations of Denmark 
 Foreign relations of Thailand
 Andreas du Plessis de Richelieu (1852-1932), a Danish naval officer and businessman who became a Siamese admiral and minister of the navy.

References

External links
 Thai Consulate in Copenhagen 
 Danish-Thai Chamber of Commerce

 
Thailand
Bilateral relations of Thailand